Rigsbee is a surname. Notable people with the surname include:

David Rigsbee (born 1949), American poet, contributing editor, and book reviewer
Shani Rigsbee (born 1967), American singer-songwriter, producer, and actress